Port Royale 3: Pirates & Merchants is the third installment to the business simulation game Port Royale: Gold, Power and Pirates and Port Royale 2. It is set in the Caribbean during the 16th and 17th centuries. Created by Kalypso Media which founded Gaming Minds Studios in 2009 after Ascaron Entertainment went bankrupt, it combines a business simulator with real-time battles and towns that can be owned, built, developed or razed. This is the 1st installment of the Port Royale Series done by Gaming Minds Studios.

The first preview of Port Royale 3 took place during the Gamescom trade fair which was held from 17 to 21 August 2011 in Cologne, Germany.

Story

The protagonist is a young Spanish commoner who left Spain to explore the New World. An accident at sea casts him overboard, and he finds himself in the Caribbean city of Port Royale. His life changes forever when he meets Elena, the beautiful daughter of the Viceroy.  He has two options to win her heart: The merchant "Path of the Trader" or the pirate "Path of the Adventurer."

Path of The Trader details the economic part of the game. Elena and her father grew up from the humble town of Cayman.  Cayman had been overlooked by the major European powers and traders and struggled economically. The Trader decides to win her heart through developing the small colony into a bustling city, all while dealing with a superficial rival suitor who woos Elena with gaudy gifts instead of helping the town.

Path of the Adventurer details the combat aspect of the game.  Elena is captured by pirates hired by a young Frenchman who plans to marry her. The Adventurer ends up at war with the French in order to save Elena.

Gameplay
Port Royale 3 is an open-ended game, so players can choose to pursue several careers. This could range from a business tycoon to a pirate. Initially, you must trade goods between Caribbean colonies to make money, but over the long term you can have substantial business interests in many Caribbean ports, and support large fighting fleets.
 
As a business tycoon, you trade with towns to gain their friendship, and can then buy building permits to establish businesses there. Ultimately, you can even come to have your own town, but this can take a very long time.  As a buccaneer (with a Letter of Marque), you can attack any of the four colonial nations in the Caribbean circa 1600; from largest to smallest: Spain, England, France, and the Netherlands. If you have not acquired a Letter of Marque, each nation will see you as a pirate.
 
Ships range from a small Pinnace to a massive Ship of the Line. There are also missions you can complete for money, supplies, or improved relations. At higher levels you can also automate the game to some degree, by setting up trade routes that your trading fleets will follow from town to town.
 
Fickle politics impact the game. One year you might choose to be loyal to Spain and fight England - but a year later, might join the Dutch in their fight against the French.
 
Famous pirates of the age also make appearances. These sea wolves are likely to attack any ship or town that they please, including those that belong to the player. They usually operate from heavily fortified bases, but if you defeat them, you'll gain favor with any nation you choose.
 
Initially, you have operating constraints (how many fleets you may have and how many towns you can buy building permits in), but as you gain levels (based on net worth), you can have unlimited fleets and permits.

As opposed to its predecessor, Port Royale 2, where the player controls only one ship against their opponents' fleet, the player now can enter naval combat with 2 additional escort ships from their fleet which are automated. The player can switch control between the ships, allowing for greater flexibility in combat. The option of being rewarded with one's own town within the game by the viceroy of a nation for contributions (taking over of a warring nation's town), has now been replaced by a system allowing the player to take over the towns existing in the world via military or diplomatic means.

Reception
On Metacritic, Port Royale 3 received a rating of 56/100 for Xbox 360, 54/100 for PC, and does not have sufficient reviews for an aggregate rating on PlayStation 3.

Midlife Gamer gave the game 6/10, stating "Action is not the order of the day here. Port Royale 3 is incredibly slow paced especially during the first few hours." and that "The visuals in Port Royale are a mixed bag. The in game cut scenes look really nice; sadly the same cannot be said for the trading over world map. It’s nowhere near as pleasing to the eye as other parts of the game so much so to the point that it looks like you are playing a much older game."

Gamespot rated the title 5/10, noting that although it looked good and played smoothly, despite there being plenty to do in the game none of it was much fun.

References

External links

2012 video games
Age of Discovery video games
Business simulation games
Windows games
Mobile games
Video games developed in Germany
Trade simulation games
Video games about pirates
Video games set in the Caribbean
PlayStation 3 games
Xbox 360 games
Video game sequels